Chedworth Roman Villa is located near Chedworth, Gloucestershire, England and is a scheduled monument. It is one of the largest and most elaborate Roman villas so far discovered in Britain and one with the latest occupation beyond the Roman period. The villa was built in phases from the early 2nd century to the 5th century, with the 4th-century construction transforming the building into an elite dwelling arranged around three sides of a courtyard. The 4th-century building included a heated and furnished west wing containing a dining-room (triclinium) with a fine mosaic floor, as well as two separate bathing suites: one for damp-heat and one for dry-heat.

The villa was discovered in 1864, and was excavated and opened to public view soon afterwards. It was acquired in 1924 by the National Trust who have conducted a long-term conservation programme, with new on-site facilities and cover-buildings.

Historians have debated whether Chedworth was a villa rustica or a religious sanctuary and hostel, as evidence has been found in support of both arguments. Most currently believe, however, that Chedworth was the former, inhabited by a very wealthy Romano-Briton.

Siting

The villa stands in a sheltered, shady, position overlooking the River Coln in the Cotswold Hills in Gloucestershire. Cirencester's reputation as a centre of tribal government and a civitas capital led to quick romanisation of the area and resulting concentration of wealth. Chedworth's location in the Cotswolds and the valley of the River Coln was important for agriculture. It was one of about fifty villas in the Cotswolds, and one of nine in just a  radius.

The villa was deliberately located next to a natural spring in the north west corner of the complex which was the villa's main source of water, and around which was later built an apsidal shrine to the water-nymphs (nymphaeum).

History

Goodburn suggests that the initial construction was related to the retirement of veteran soldiers as the area became settled under Roman rule. The two nearest settlements were Corinium (Cirencester) founded in about 50 and Glevum (Gloucester) founded in 97. When these centres ceased to be military bases, the soldiers retired to lands provided by the Roman governorship in recognition of military service. It is noteworthy that twenty-two Roman villas have been found within a ten-mile radius of Chedworth.

The villa has gone through several stages of growth and rebuilding. A clear and robust interpretation of the evidence of these different stages can be found both graphically and textually in Goodburn's book produced for the National Trust.The villa was founded about 120 and during this earliest phase (Phase I) the villa consisted of separate buildings around 3 sides of a rectangle open to the east with a bath house to the north. The original structures were quite utilitarian in nature unlike the later grandeur of the estate. Archaeologists have identified at least six different periods of construction or re-construction. All of these stages resulted in an expansion or an improvement of the original buildings.

In the early 3rd century (Phase II) the west and south wings were rebuilt following a fire, and the north bath suite was enlarged with extra rooms added to its eastern side. In the early 4th century (Phase III), the villa was transformed into an elite dwelling enclosing the courtyard. The existing wings were linked by a covered portico, and an inner garden and outer courtyard were created. The dining-room (triclinium) received its mosaics and the northern half of the west wing was converted to become a second set of baths. Shortly afterwards (Phase IIIA) the baths in the north wing were rebuilt and changed to dry-heat (laconicum) baths, which meant that the villa had both damp-heat and dry-heat bathing suites. The floors of at least 15 rooms were decorated with mosaics. In the late 4th century (Phase IV) the north wing was extended with the addition of a new dining-room. Many of the rooms, particularly the dining rooms were heated by hypocaust.

A feature unique in Britain and discovered in 2017 is that a significant building phase of the villa dates from the 5th century after the end of Roman rule in Britain (410). In room 28 the mosaic and walls on the east and west sides were installed after 424.
This is the first evidence that concentrated wealth funded Roman lifestyles in Britain for at least 50 years later than previously thought, as the building of new rooms with a mosaic is evidence of prestige spending on specialized skills including mosaic craftsmen. Other mosaics in neighbouring rooms, including room 30, show stylistic similarities and may also be of the 5th century.

Later a workshop was installed on top of the mosaic floor and two hearths, made out of pieces of architecture of the villa, were built into the worn floor of the room.

52% of the coins found at the villa date from 564 to 585 showing that intensive occupation continued into the post-Roman period.

Carus-Wilson has suggested that there may have been a fulling operation on the site during the 1200s. Perhaps an early article in Scientific American (June 1925) promoted the thought. This idea has been latterly disproved by Peter Salway.

Nymphaeum

The pool in the north-west corner of the villa complex was developed from the naturally occurring fresh-water spring which most likely inspired the location of the villa in the first place. The spring became a location for an apsidal shrine to the water-nymphs (nymphaeum). The extant curved rear wall is 2 metres high and is the original Roman masonry.

All of the water needs of the villa were provided for by this spring.  An octagonal pool is located at the centre and is still fed by the spring; a Christian chi-rho monogram was discovered scratched onto what was the rim of the pool. This symbol had a short presence in the early fourth century but was soon replaced by the original water nymphs.

Temples

Foundations of a Romano-British temple have been excavated about 800 metres south-east of the villa buildings. The remains comprise the southwest and southeast corners of a rectangular building, measuring 16.5m by 16.0m. Altars preserved in the villa museum probably came from the temple as did coins, glass tesserae and a stone carved niche.

There was, however, another Roman building in Chedworth Woods about 150 metres northwest of the villa which was destroyed in the construction of the railway around 1869. Finds included coins, hexagonal tiles, fragments of pillars, part of a shell-headed niche and glass tesserae. The stone relief of a "hunter god" with hare, dog and stag, sometimes ascribed to the southeast temple, may have come from this site.

Another carved figure was discovered bearing a fragmentary inscription which it is believed may refer to the healing god Mars Lenus, a deity of the Treveri tribe in Gaul.

Discovery and display

The villa was accidentally discovered in 1864 by Thomas Margetts, a gamekeeper who was digging for a ferret, and found fragments of mosaic tesserae. The site was subsequently excavated in 1865-7 by James Farrer, an antiquarian and the Member of Parliament for South Durham. The owner of the land was the Earl of Eldon, and it was he who financed the excavations, roofing for the mosaics, and the building of the mock-Tudor lodge to house the artifacts. Little, if anything, of the excavations was recorded. Only the best four mosaics were left exposed under shelters and the rest were reburied for their protection.

In 1924 the villa was acquired by the National Trust. Excavations have taken place periodically since then.

In 1957-1965 Prof. Ian Richmond excavated and re-interpreted Chedworth but died in 1965 without publishing any results. Parts of the villa were re-buried.

In 2011 a new cover building was provided for the mosaics in the west wing to ensure their preservation.

A geophysical survey of the field east of the villa in 2012 revealed a central approach road running up from the valley floor and two other buildings, one a circular stone structure on the south side of the road.

A new excavation campaign started in 2013 on the north wing and has revealed previously unrecorded mosaics, partially destroyed by Ian Richmond in 1964.

Geometric meander patterns

The pavement mosaics in several rooms exhibit the typical geometric meander patterns found in other Roman villas throughout England. The dining room floor contains one of the most elaborate geometric designs found in the villa. Although in good condition, there are substantial portions of it missing. However, a simple mathematical algorithm has been discovered that is able to reconstruct the missing parts of the mosaic from what is still there.

New building

In recent times, it was considered that Victorian efforts at conservation on the site were outdated and that the early shelters weren't providing sufficient protection. The National Trust appointed Feilden Clegg Bradley Studios to design a new conservation building as well as a learning facility for the archaeological site. At the same time the reception building was refurbished.
The £2.2m project was completed in March 2012.

Notes

References
 
 
 Goodburn, Roger. (1972), The Roman Villa: Chedworth, Curwen Press,

Further reading
Simon Esmonde Cleary, (2012), Chedworth Roman Villa. National Trust Guide. 
Stephanie Jeane Toussaint, (2013), "A comparative geometric analysis of the patterns found on the pavement mosaics of the Chedworth Roman villa." In Proceedings of Bridges Enschede: Mathematics, Music, Art, Architecture, Culture, Hart, G. & Sarhangi, R., (Eds.), Enschede, The Netherlands, July 27–31, pp. 55–62.

External links 

Chedworth Roman Villa information at the National Trust
Heritage Trail page
 

Houses completed in the 4th century
National Trust properties in Gloucestershire
Roman villas in Gloucestershire
Museums in Gloucestershire
Museums of ancient Rome in the United Kingdom
Archaeological museums in England
Scheduled monuments in Gloucestershire
2nd-century establishments in Roman Britain
5th-century disestablishments in Roman Britain